Riadh Sidaoui (رياض الصيداوي) (born 14 May 1967) is a Swiss-Tunisian writer, journalist and political scientist.

He is the director of the Geneva-based Arab Centre for Political and Social Research and Analysis, and the editor-in-chief of the news website Taqadoumiya since 2010. He published articles in London-based newspapers such as Al-Hayat and Al-Quds Al-Arabi.

Education
After completing High School education in Bouhajla, he obtained a master's degree in journalism (political specialization) from the Institute of Press and Information Sciences of Tunis in 1992, and a DEA (diplôme d'études approfondies) in 1995 from the Faculty of Humanities and Social Sciences of Tunis.

He moved to Switzerland in 1995, where he earned a Master of Advanced Studies in development studies from the Graduate Institute of Development Studies in 1997, and a Master of Advanced Studies in political sciences from the Faculty of Economics and Social Sciences of the University of Geneva in 1998.

Thought

Islamists
Sidaoui draws attention to the notion that many fanatical Islamists have degrees in sciences; in fact, the September 11, 2001 attacks were committed by men who had completed studies in natural sciences. He explains: "Despite the lack of a comprehensive study on the occupational origin of the leadership of Islamist movements in the Arab world, we can see an almost total domination of scientific careers. It seems that the number of engineers, doctors, physicists, etc., acting on behalf of Islam, is considerable. This thesis is confirmed by the success of Islamists in the elections of scientific advice in the faculties of sciences. This same success is difficult if not impossible in the faculties of Humanities and Social Sciences.".

After the fall of Arab dictators in the Arab Spring, Sidaoui said that the first winners of the revolutions are Islamists in view of their capacity of mobilization and organization. In addition, he noted that the Islamists have the overwhelming support of the Arab countries in the Persian Gulf, the petrodollars, but also the United States, that accept a moderate Islam in the Arab world (as in Turkey).

Saudi Wahhabism
According to Riadh Sidaoui, habitual use of the term Wahhabism is scientifically false, and it should be substituted with the concept of Saudi Wahhabism, an Islamic doctrine which is based on the historical alliance between the political and financial power represented by Ibn Saud and the religious authority represented by Abdul Al-Wahhab. The doctrine continues to exist to this day thanks to this alliance, the financing of several religious channels, and the formation of several sheikhs.

Sidaoui thinks that the political foundations of Islam lie in the republican democratic and non-Wahhabi monarchy mind. For him Saudi Wahhabism is a threat to Islam, Muslims and all humanity.

Publications

In English
 "The Inner Weakness of Arab Media", in Natascha Fioretti et Marcello Foa, Islam and the Western World: the Role of the Media, éd. European Journalism Observatory, Lugano, 2008 ;
 "Islamic Politics and the Military: Algeria 1962–2008", in Jan-Erik Lane et Hamadi Redissi, Religion and Politics: Islam and Muslim Civilisation, éd. Ashgate Publishing, Farnham, 2009, p. 225–247. .

In Arabic
Hiwarat nassiriyya (حوارات ناصرية) éd. Arabesques, Tunis, 1992 (rééd. Centre arabe de recherches et d'analyses, Beyrouth, 2003).  ;
Heikel aw al milaf asirri il dhakira al arabiyya (هيكل أو الملف السري للذاكرة العربية), Tunis, 1993 (rééd. Le Caire, 2000 et Beyrouth, 2003).  ;
 Siraat annourab assiyasiyya wal askariyya fil jazair : al hizb, al jaych, al dawla (صراعات النخب السياسية والعسكرية في الجزائر: الحزب،) (الجيش، الدولة, éd. Arab Institute for Research and Publishing, Beyrouth, 2000 ;
 Jean Ziegler yatahadath ila al Arab (جان زجلر يتحدث إلى العرب), éd. Centre arabe de recherches et d'analyses, Beyrouth, 2003 ;
Maarek Abd Ennacer (معارك عبد الناصر), éd. Centre arabe de recherches et d'analyses, Beyrouth, 2003 ;

In French
 L'islamisme en Algérie: une révolution en marche ?, éd. Université de Genève, Genève, 1998;
 FIS, armée, GIA : vainqueurs et vaincus, éd. Publisud, Paris, 2002;
 L'Armée algérienne 1954/1994: Mutations internes, éd. Centre arabe de recherches et d'analyses, Paris, 2003.

References

1967 births
Living people
Tunis University alumni
Graduate Institute of International and Development Studies alumni
Academic staff of the University of Geneva
People from Kairouan
Tunisian writers
Swiss political scientists
Tunisian expatriates in Switzerland
Swiss people of Tunisian descent